Eduardo Alas Alfaro (2 July 1930 – 27 February 2020) was a Salvadoran Roman Catholic bishop.

Alas Alfaro was born in El Salvador and was ordained to the priesthood in 1960. He served as bishop of the Roman Catholic Diocese of Chalatenango, El Salvador, from 1987 to 2007. He died on 27 February 2020.

Notes

1930 births
2020 deaths
20th-century Roman Catholic bishops in El Salvador
21st-century Roman Catholic bishops in El Salvador
Roman Catholic bishops of Chalatenango